Sarah Irving is the Executive Vice President and Chief Brand Officer of Irving Oil, a Canadian oil refinery and member company of the Irving Group of Companies, since 2015. She is the granddaughter of K.C. Irving, and heir to billionaire Arthur Irving with an estimated net worth of US$7.01 billion. As the only member of the Irving family running the company, it is suggested that Sarah Irving will eventually succeed ownership.

Irving serves as an adviser to Dartmouth College's Dartmouth College Fund, the school's primary source of financial aid, and on the Board of Governors for the Rothesay Netherwood School. She is also a board trustee for the IWK Foundation.

Business career
Upon graduating from Dartmouth College in 2010, Irving worked as a strategy consultant for Deloitte in New York for two years before returning to school to receive her MBA. Upon graduating, Irving joined Ian Whitcomb, previously a partner at Deloitte, to lead the family-owned petroleum products refiner and distributor, Irving Oil.

She is currently on the leadership team of Irving Oil, as the company's Executive Vice President and Chief Brand Officer. In addition, Irving becomes the second of Arthur Irving's children (his eldest son, Kenneth, was President of Irving Oil for a decade but abruptly left in 2010 ) to hold a senior position at the company, suggesting a possible succession plan at Irving Oil, in which Sarah Irving will take over the privately owned business.

As Chief Brand Officer, Irving has led several initiatives to improve the oil company's community image, such as raising $300,000 to help defray hospital travel costs with the company's seven partner hospitals across Canada and New England. She has also served as the key note speaker for a charity auction hosted by the Junior Achievement branch in Canada. Additionally, Irving served as the key note speaker at the East Coast Energy Connection conference, in which she described the critical role that Saint John, Canada played in the future of Irving Oil.

In 2016, Irving was listed as one of Canada's most powerful business people.

Education
Irving graduated from the  Rothesay Netherwood School in 2006, where she currently serves as a Governor. In 2010, Irving received a Bachelor of Arts degree (cum laude) from Dartmouth College, where she rowed division 1 crew and competed at the NCAA Division I Rowing Championship. In 2014, Irving received a Masters in Business Administration from the Tuck School of Business at Dartmouth.

Personal
In 2016, Irving, Irving Oil, her family, and the Arthur L. Irving Family Foundation made a lead gift of $80 million to Dartmouth College, founding the Arthur L. Irving Institute for Energy and Society. The donation was considered controversial by alumni of the college given the conflict of interest between Irving Oil and the center's mission of tackling global energy issues. In addition, an opinion article in The Dartmouth directly criticized Irving for funding the institute.

References

See also
CBC New Brunswick coverage of Sarah Irving

Living people
Canadian women chief executives
Tuck School of Business alumni
Year of birth missing (living people)